Phillip Anthony Beasley (born January 30, 1983), known professionally as Philthy Rich is an American rapper.

He first began his career in 2007 when he recruited fellow rappers Mistah F.A.B., J. Stalin, Shady Nate, Beeda Weeda, Ray Ryda, Eddi Projex & Lil Al tha Gamer to come on tour with him. The tour, "Stan Bizzness BG's", was cancelled after Philthy was arrested for selling cocaine and cannabis, after which he was sentenced to a year in jail.

He signed to RBC Records & eOne Music in 2013 and released N.E.R.N.L. 2 on June 18. The album features guest appearances from Fabolous, Gunplay and Dc Young Fly Problem French Montana Trae tha Truth, among others.

Personal life

Beasley grew up in the Seminary neighborhood of Oakland. 

In 2020, Beasley was arrested again by police for shooting at a teenage man named Orlando Bermudez Jr. of New Jersey. During a Fourth of July party in Las Vegas, Nevada, Bermudez shot and struck a different individual (who was shortly afterwards declared dead) when Beasley took fire at Bermudez. Beasley was also booked on possession of an illegal weapon which was loaded having appeared on the Discovery Channel's series Gang Wars. He was sentenced to probation and six months in jail.

On February 13, 2011, Beasley was arrested with two other people after a rap concert at a nightclub in San Francisco, California for owning a Bentley that was reported stolen out of Las Vegas.

In August 2012, Beasley was shot 3 times and drove himself to a hospital where he was released the following day.

Controversy
On September 25, 2013, he released a track entitled "Swear to God" featuring Kurt Diggler. It dissed Bay Area rappers Kafani, Messy Marv & DB Tha General. The track is to appear on his upcoming album N.E.R.N.L. 3. In response, DB released a diss track at Philthy entitled "Luke 16:13" featuring Quise the Criminal on September 27, to be released on his upcoming album Motel 6. That same day Kafani released a diss track entitled "Philthy You a Verse Lick", and "Philthy Bitch" the next day, where he described how he decided to remove Philthy Rich from his song "Slide Thru" featuring Rayven Justice. On September 28, Philthy Rich released another diss track entitled "The Ice Queen, The Girl Girl & The Bebe Store" which also dissed Lavish D. On October 1, 2013, Lavish released two diss tracks entitled "Lyrical Ether" and "King of Oakland". In response, Shady Nate & Philthy released a diss track entitled "Fuck Lavish D". Messy Marv plans on releasing a diss record entitled Philthy Rich Is a Bitch on October 22. On October 15, Philthy released a diss record entitled Messy Marv a.k.a. the Girl Girl Is a Fake Blood, containing a freestyle diss over Drake's "Pound Cake / Paris Morton Music 2". The next day, Marv dissed Philthy in a track entitled "I'm Right Here".

Discography

Studio albums
Funk or Die (2009)
Loyalty B4 Royalty (2009)
Neighborhood Supastar (2009)
Neighborhood Supastar 2 (2010)
Loyalty B4 Royalty Vol. 2 (2010)
Trip'n 4 Life (2011)
Loyalty B4 Royalty Vol. 3 (2011)
Kill ZoneN.E.R.N.L. (2012)N.E.R.N.L. 2 (2013)N.E.R.N.L. 3 (2014)Real Niggas Back In StyleSem God (2017)Fake Love (2018)East Oakland Legend (2019)Big 59 (2019)Hometown Hero (2020)Real Hate (2020)Phillip Beasley Ep (2021)Solidified Ep  (2021)Motivational Purpose (2022)
 N.E.R.N.L. 4 (TBA)
 (TBA)

EPsSlap House: Thizz Mix (2009)Funk or Die: The Leak (2009)Flyest Figga on 2 Feet (2009)Trip'n 4 Life: The Leak (2009)Streets on Lock EP (2010)

Independent albumsSlap House Vol. 4 (2008)Free Philthy Rich (2009)Quit Hatin' on the Bay (2009)Funk Season (2009)Funk Season 2 (2010)Funk Season 3 (2011)SemCity Money Man (2014)SemCity Money Man 2 (2014)SemCity Money Man 3 (2015)SemCity Money Man 4 (2016)

MixtapesStreets on Lock (2008)PhilthyFresh (2008)Hood Rich 3 (2011)GSlaps Radio Vol. 2 (2011)True Religion Shawty (2012)Conspiracy (with Dem Hoodstarz) (2012)Kill Zone: The Leak (2012)
"Vampin In The Bay" (Dj Racks & Jim Jones) (2012)Messy Marv a.k.a. the Girl Girl Is a Fake Blood (2013)Hood Rich 4 (2016)Seminary (2017)Neighborhood Supastar 4 (2017) 

 with The Boy Boy AKA Messy Marv Neighborhood Supastar Vol. 3 (2011)

with Chris Lockett11-5900 (2012)

with DJ FreshMy Block: Welcome to Sem City (2008)My Block: Welcome to Sem City 2 (2010)

with FOD EntertainmentFOD The Infrastructure (2022)Motion Family (2022)

with J-Diggs
 Izm 101 (2012)

with J. StalinEarly Morning Shift, Vol. 3 (2010)

with M Dot 80A~1 Since Day One (2014)

with Pooh Hefner#NOBFE (2012)#NOBFE Vol. 2 (2013)#NOBFE Vol. 3 (2013)

with Ray RydahTha Skumbagz (2008)

with Stevie JoePhilthy Fresh (2009)Philthy Fresh 3 (2017)

with Teek da KidTown Bizz Allstars (2009)

with Thizz NationThizz Nation Vol. 27 (2010)

with Toohda Band$Money Motivated'' (2021)

Singles
2008: "Straight Outta Oakland" (featuring Ros, J. Stalin, Stevie Joe, Kaz Kyzah, Shady Nate, Lil Blood, Eddi Projex, Beeda Weeda, Keak da Sneak, Mistah F.A.B. & Too Short)
2009: "Follow the Money" (featuring Stevie Joe & Kaz Kyzah)
2009: "Teeth 2 Feet" (featuring Keak da Sneak & Stevie Joe)
2009: "I Represent It"
2010: "Feeln’ Like Pac" (featuring E-40)
2010: "Do It Better" (featuring Lil Kev)
2012: "Moving Birds" (featuring Waka Flocka Flame & YG Hootie)
2014: "Straight to the Money" (featuring Montana Montana Montana)
2015: "Showtime" (featuring Icewear Vezzo)
2015: "Make A Living" (featuring Iamsu!)

Song Features
2010: "Ain`t goin out like that"  By Ill Slim Collin (featuring: Philthy Rich, L Boy & K Hurl) 
2012: 'Stevie Joe Presents: Who Got Next?,' "Cali Connected"  By Sheye T. (featuring: Philthy Rich & Mr. J Noxx)

References

http://www.thizzler.com/blog/2014/10/9/montana-montana-montana-x-philthy-rich-montana-mamies.html
http://www.thizzler.com/blog/2014/5/24/montana-montana-montana-ft-boy-big-philthy-rich-straight-to.html
http://www.thizzler.com/blog/2014/10/18/montana-montana-montana-ft-philthy-rich-straight-to-the-mone.html
http://www.thizzler.com/blog/tag/montana-montana-montana?currentPage=4
https://web.archive.org/web/20160820010147/http://siccness.net/wp/introducing-montana-montana-montana-925five-records

External links

1983 births
American people convicted of drug offenses
American shooting survivors
Living people
Rappers from Oakland, California
Gangsta rappers
21st-century American rappers
21st-century American male musicians